NGC 3898 is a spiral galaxy in the constellation Ursa Major. It was discovered by William Herschel on April 14, 1789.

See also
 List of NGC objects (3001–4000)

Gallery

References

External links
 

Unbarred spiral galaxies
3898
Ursa Major (constellation)
036921